Dance Kahani (meaning dance story; previously The Dance Diaries) is a Pakistan's first dance film directed and written by Omar Hassan. Dance Kahani is produced by OSCO FILMS, 99 FILMS and Ion Entertainment in association with Act One. The film stars Madeleine Hanna, Alamdar Khan and Vernin U'chong. Dance Kahani is the first film exploring the underground dance culture and free running on the streets of Karachi.

Plot outline
"With her dream of pursuing a professional dance career shattered, she must now fight the odds to keep it alive in a society she never wanted to be a part of." This is how Nizzy, an upscale British Pakistani, must survive her predicament.

Cast
Madeleine Hanna as Nuzhat/Nizzy
Vernin U'chong as Tipu
Alamdar Khan as Shobby
Abdul Ghani as Jo
Shezi Khan as Saadi
Ramiz Law as Silent Sid
Abdul Rahim Langove as Sam
Ali Parkour as Adnan/Eddie
Irfan as Aamir
Imran Shaukat as Jawed Ali 
Rahid Sami as Anwer Ali
Sabiha Zia as Qurat ul Ain/Annie
Talat as Asma Jawed
Niggy Imtiaz as Feroza Anwer
Barkat Ali as Sunny
Asifa Ataka as Farida Junaid
Sajjad Ali as Rickshaw Driver
Farhan Baig - guest appearance

Production
The film was shot on RED using Carl Zeiss lenses, despite being an independent low budget initiative by a new generation filmmaker from Pakistan. The movie illustrates aspiration, dreams, and talent against the odds.

Release

Marketing
A film teaser was released on 6 April 2014 along with an official theatrical poster. The movie is also expected to release later in 2015. The character poster featuring Tipu was revealed on 14 November 2015. First look promo of film was revealed online on 17 November. Theatrical trailer was revealed on social media website on 9 July 2016.

See also
 List of Pakistani films of 2016
 Dance films

References

External links

2016 films
Pakistani dance films
2010s dance films